Stemonosudis miscella is a species of fish found in the Eastern Indian Ocean close to Sumatra, Indonesia,.

Size

References 

Paralepididae
Taxa named by Vilhelm Ege
Fish described in 1933